Mumbai is the entertainment, fashion and commercial centre of India. Mumbai is the largest economy in India. As of 2021, Mumbai's Nominal GDP is estimated to be US$277.980 billion and GDP (PPP) is estimated to be US$606.625 billion, Mumbai's GDP (PPP) per capita rounds up to around US$23,000. It is the richest Indian city and 12th richest city in the world with a net wealth of around US$1 trillion with 46,000 millionaires and 48 billionaires. Mumbai accounts for slightly more than 6.16% of India's economy contributing 10% of factory employment,  30% of income tax collections, 45% of Entertainment Tax, 60% of customs duty collections, 20% of central excise tax collections, 40% of foreign trade , 100% of stock market assets and rupees 1,60,000 crore (US$20 billion) in corporate taxes to the Indian economy.

The Headquarters of a number of Indian financial institutions such as the Bombay Stock Exchange, the Reserve Bank of India, the National Stock Exchange, the Mint as well as numerous Indian companies such as the Tata Group, Essel Group and Reliance Industries are located in Mumbai. Most of these offices are located in downtown South Mumbai which is the nerve centre of the Indian economy. Mumbai also has Dalal Street, which is the address of Bombay Stock Exchange and several financial institutions. Many foreign establishments also have their branches in the South Bombay area. Mumbai is also home to some of India's richest people, including Mukesh Ambani.

Mumbai is the world's 17th largest city by GDP. Mumbai was ranked among the fastest cities in India for business startup in 2009. Mumbai has a Nominal GDP per capita of around US$11,890.

Occupations

Mumbai has traditionally owed its prosperity largely to its textile mills and its seaport till the 1980s. These are now mostly replaced by industries employing more skilled labour such as engineering, diamond polishing, healthcare, pharmaceutical marketing and information technology. Mumbai is also the primary financial centre for India, Houses both the major Indian stock exchanges Bombay Stock Exchange and The National Stock Exchange which are the 9th and 10th largest stock exchanges in the world by market capitalization, brokerages, asset management companies (including majority of the mutual fund companies), headquarters of most Indian state-owned and commercial banks, as well as the financial & monetary regulatory authorities of India (SEBI and RBI among other institutions) have their headquarters in Mumbai.

As Mumbai is the capital of Maharashtra, so government employees make up a large percentage of the city's workforce. Mumbai also has a large semi-skilled labour population, who primarily earn their livelihood as hawkers, taxi drivers, mechanics and other such proletarian professions. The port of Mumbai and shipping industry too employs many residents directly and indirectly. Like most other metropolitan cities, Mumbai also has a large influx of people from rural areas looking for employment.

The entertainment industry is the other major employer in Mumbai. Most of India's television and satellite networks are located in Mumbai, as well as the major publishing houses. A large number of the Hindi and English television shows are produced in Mumbai. The Hindi movie industry, also known as Bollywood, is also located in Mumbai, along with the largest studios and production houses. To add to this, most major advertising companies operating in India also have their primary office in Mumbai.

Industries

Mumbai is one of the ten largest trading centres in the world in terms of global financial flows, generating ca. 6.16% of the Indian GDP and accounting for 25% of industrial production, 70% of Indian maritime trade and 70% of capital transactions to the Indian economy.

Several major Indian companies are headquartered in Mumbai. The three largest private companies in India, Tata Group, Reliance Industries, and Aditya Birla Group, are based in Mumbai. Below is a list of some of these major companies:

Consumer Goods Industries
Mumbai is home to some of India's largest consumer packaged goods companies like Tata Consumer Products , Colgate-Palmolive, Godrej Consumer Products and many much more.

Transport

Railway 
Another key contributor to Mumbai's Economy is the transport sector, the city has been investing in and developing various transport related infrastructure projects. Mumbai Suburban Railway, popularly referred to as Locals forms the backbone of the city's transport system. It is operated by the Central Railway and Western Railway zones of the Indian Railways. Mumbai's suburban rail systems carried a total of 63 lakh (6.3 million) passengers every day in 2007. Trains are overcrowded during peak hours, with nine-car trains of rated capacity 1,700 passengers, actually carrying around 4,500 passengers at peak hours. The Mumbai rail network is spread at an expanse of 319 route kilometres. 191 rakes (train-sets) of 9 car and 12 car composition are utilized to run a total of 2,226 train services in the city.

The Mumbai Monorail and Mumbai Metro have been built and are being extended in phases to relieve overcrowding on the existing network. The Monorail opened in early February 2014. The first line of the Mumbai Metro opened in early June 2014.

Mumbai is the headquarters of two zones of the Indian Railways: the Central Railway (CR) headquartered at Chhatrapati Shivaji Terminus (formerly Victoria Terminus), and the Western Railway (WR) headquartered at Churchgate. Mumbai is also well connected to most parts of India by the Indian Railways. Long-distance trains originate from Chhatrapati Shivaji Terminus, Dadar, Lokmanya Tilak Terminus, Mumbai Central, Bandra Terminus, Andheri and Borivali.

Bus 
Mumbai's bus services carried over 55 lakh (5.5 million) passengers per day in 2008, which dropped to 28 lakh (2.8 million) in 2015. Public buses run by BEST cover almost all parts of the metropolis, as well as parts of Navi Mumbai, Mira-Bhayandar and Thane. The BEST operates a total of 4,608 buses with CCTV cameras installed, ferrying 45 lakh (4.5 million) passengers daily over 390 routes. Its fleet consists of single-decker, double-decker, vestibule, low-floor, disabled-friendly, air-conditioned and Euro III compliant diesel and compressed natural gas powered buses. BEST introduced air-conditioned buses in 1998. BEST buses are red in colour, based originally on the Routemaster buses of London.
Maharashtra State Road Transport Corporation (MSRTC, also known as ST) buses provide intercity transport connecting Mumbai with other towns and cities of Maharashtra and nearby states. The Navi Mumbai Municipal Transport (NMMT) and Thane Municipal Transport (TMT) also operate their buses in Mumbai, connecting various nodes of Navi Mumbai and Thane to parts of Mumbai.

Buses are generally favoured for commuting short to medium distances, while train fares are more economical for longer distance commutes.

The Mumbai Darshan is a tourist bus service which explores numerous tourist attractions in Mumbai. Bus Rapid Transit System lanes have been planned throughout Mumbai. Though 88% of the city's commuters travel by public transport, Mumbai still continues to struggle with traffic congestion. Mumbai's transport system has been categorised as one of the most congested in the world.

Road 
Mumbai is served by National Highway 48, National Highway 66, National Highway 160 and National Highway 61. The Mumbai–Chennai and Mumbai–Delhi prongs of the Golden Quadrilateral system of National Highways start from the city. The Mumbai-Pune Expressway was the first expressway built in India. The Eastern Freeway was opened in 2013. The Mumbai Nashik Expressway, Mumbai-Vadodara Expressway, are under construction. The Bandra-Worli Sea Link bridge, along with Mahim Causeway, links the island city to the western suburbs. The three major road arteries of the city are the Eastern Express Highway from Sion to Thane, the Sion Panvel Expressway from Sion to Panvel and the Western Express Highway from Bandra to Bhayander. There are five tolled entry points to the city by road.

Mumbai had about 721,000 private vehicles as of March 2014, 56,459 black and yellow taxis , and 106,000 auto rickshaws, as of May 2013.

Air 
The Chhatrapati Shivaji Maharaj International Airport (formerly Sahar International Airport) is the main aviation hub in the city and the second busiest airport in India in terms of passenger traffic. It handled 3.66 crore (36.6 million) passengers and 694,300 tonnes of cargo during FY 2014–2015. An upgrade plan was initiated in 2006, targeted at increasing the capacity of the airport to handle up to 4 crore (40 million) passengers annually and the new terminal T2 was opened in February 2014.

The proposed Navi Mumbai International airport to be built in the Kopra-Panvel area has been sanctioned by the Indian Government and will help relieve the increasing traffic burden on the existing airport.

The Juhu Aerodrome was India's first airport, and now hosts the Bombay Flying Club and a heliport operated by state-owned Pawan Hans.

Services

Tourism
The World Travel & Tourism Council calculated that tourism generated US$3.9 billion or 3.2% of the city's GDP in 2016 and supported 637,900 jobs, 7.3% of its total employment. The sector is predicted to grow at an average annual rate of 8.8% to US$9 billion by 2026 (3.1% of GDP). Mumbai's tourism industry accounted for 5.4% of India's total travel and tourism-related GDP in 2016, and employed 2.4% of the country's total workforce.

Foreign tourists accounted for 35.7% of all tourism-related spending in Mumbai in 2016. Nearly one-fifth of foreign tourists visiting the city come from the United Arab Emirates.

Other

Below is a list of major industries located in Mumbai:

 Hindi film industry
 Marathi film industry
 Automotive parts
 Utensils
 Biscuits (Cookies)
 Clothing
 Textile mills
 Pencils
 Tractors
 Pharmaceuticals
 Import 
 Export
 IT
 Health Care

See also
 Make in Maharashtra
 Economy of Maharashtra
 Economy of India
 Economy of Delhi

References

Works cited